The Minnesota Golden Gophers women's ice hockey team plays for the University of Minnesota at the Twin Cities campus in Minneapolis. The team is one of the members of the Western Collegiate Hockey Association (WCHA) and competes in the National Collegiate Athletic Association (NCAA) in Division I. The Golden Gophers have won six NCAA Championships as well as the final American Women's College Hockey Alliance Championship. In the WCHA, they have also been regular season champions 11 times and tournament champions 7 times. In addition to their overall success as a competitive team, the Gophers have also been ranked in the nation's top two teams for attendance since becoming a varsity sport, and the team holds the second largest single-game attendance record for women's collegiate hockey, drawing 6,854 fans for the first Minnesota women's hockey game on November 2, 1997. The team also holds the distinction of having the longest winning streak in women's or men's college hockey at 62 games from February 17, 2012 to November 17, 2013, winning back-to-back NCAA titles during the stretch.

In 2004–2005, Minnesota also won back-to-back NCAA Championships. Natalie Darwitz was a three-time All American, and three-time finalist for the Patty Kazmaier award. Darwitz left the program with the career scoring mark at Minnesota in three years and set two NCAA single-season record with 114 points (42 Goals, 72 Assists) and most assists in 40 games in her final season. Minnesota Gophers women's hockey players have won the Patty Kazmaier Award three times (Krissy Wendell [2005], Amanda Kessel [2013], and Taylor Heise [2022]), as well as having all three finalists in 2013.

Coaches
The Gophers have had two head coaches to date: Laura Halldorson and Brad Frost. Halldorson was the head coach for eleven years, from the 1997–1998 season to the 2006–2007 season. Her overall coaching record was 278–67–22 with the Gophers, a winning percentage of .787. During that time, the Gophers won four of their five WCHA championships and three of their national championships. They averaged 28 wins per season and appeared in eight out of ten national tournaments, reaching seven finals. In addition, the Gophers experienced their best season in 2004–2005 with a 36–2–2 record.
In the 2007–08 season, Brad Frost became the temporary head coach. He had previously been an assistant coach. In his first year as head coach, Frost led the Gophers to a 21-game winning streak, with the season's record ending with 27 wins, 7 losses, and 4 ties but also ended with a conference record of 21–5–2, which ranked second in the WCHA. The Gophers made another NCAA regional appearance and post-season Frost was awarded WCHA Coach of the Year. In the 2008–2009 season, his temporary coaching status was lifted and he was named permanent head coach of the Gophers. That same season he led the Gophers to a record of 32–5–3 and to another WCHA championship. Frost then coached the Gophers into back-to-back NCAA Frozen Four championships in 2012 & 2013, which were encompassed in their 62-game winning streak. The Golden Gophers have had a cross state rivalry with the Minnesota Duluth Bulldogs. The Gophers handed the Bulldogs their first ever conference loss 4–3 in a sold-out game at Pioneer Hall on February 11, 2000.

Team history
Minnesota put its first women's team on the ice in 1997–98. Nadine Muzerall, a Canadian who graduated from Kimball Union Academy in Meriden, New Hampshire, was among its initial recruits.

During the 2004–05 season, Krissy Wendell set an NCAA record (since tied) for most shorthanded goals in one season with 7. After graduating from Minnesota, she had the career record for most shorthanded goals in a career with 16. Ironically, both marks were tied by Meghan Agosta.

In 2009–10, Noora Räty was just the second freshman to be a finalist for the Patty Kazmaier Memorial Award. Räty led the NCAA in several goaltending categories. She led the NCAA in goals-against average (1.24), save percentage (.951) and shutouts (7), while ranking third in winning percentage (.792). Her won loss record for the year was 17–3–4. In addition, Räty was the WCHA goaltending champion and earned numerous honours including All-WCHA First Team and All-WCHA Rookie Team. During the season, she was named the WCHA Defensive Player of the Week four times and WCHA Rookie of the Week on two occasions. She set a school record for most assists in one season by a goaltender (3). Räty played on national championship teams in 2011–12 and 2012–13. The 2012–13 team finished 41–0–0, and the team won the last 49 games of Räty's career. Räty finished with both the career and single-season record for shutouts.

Minnesota Duluth rivalry
Minnesota-Duluth, had been a traditional rival to the Gophers in men's hockey. In 1998, Minnesota Duluth announced that it was going to assemble a women's team for the 1999–2000 season. Duluth gave a three-year, $210,000 contract to Shannon Miller, who coached Canada to the 1998 Olympic final in Nagano. Miller recruited players from Canada, Finland and Sweden, including four Olympians. The rivalry was fuelled when Miller took two players from Minnesota: star forward Jenny Schmidgall, whose 93 points led the nation, and defenseman Brittny Ralph, who would serve as the Bulldogs' captain. In the 1999–2000 season, Duluth would lose just once to the Gophers in their first five meetings, which included a 2–0 Bulldogs victory in the final of the Western Collegiate Hockey Association tournament.

Arenas
The Golden Gophers have called two ice rinks home. From their 1997–1998 season to their 2001–2002 season the Golden Gophers shared their home ice with the men's team at Mariucci Arena. The Golden Gophers moved into Ridder Arena in the 2002–2003 season, a facility dedicated solely to a women's hockey team, and named for team benefactors Robert Ridder and Kathleen Ridder.

Year to Year

Championships

National
 2000 – American Women's College Hockey Alliance championship
 2004 – NCAA championship
 2005 – NCAA championship
 2012 – NCAA championship
 2013 – NCAA championship
 2015 – NCAA championship
 2016 – NCAA championship

Conference
Western Collegiate Hockey Association Women's Regular Season Champions
2001, 2002, 2004, 2005, 2009, 2010, 2013, 2014, 2015, 2019, 2022

Western Collegiate Hockey Association Women's Tournament Champions
2002, 2004, 2005, 2012, 2013, 2014, 2018

Current roster
As of August 20, 2022.

Captains

Olympians
The following Gophers players have participated in the women's ice hockey tournament at the Winter Olympic Games.

2002 Winter Olympics

United States national team
Natalie Darwitz- Silver
Courtney Kennedy- Silver
Lyndsay Wall- Silver
Krissy Wendell- Silver

2006 Winter Olympics 

Finland national team

 Noora Räty- 4th Place

United States national team
Natalie Darwitz- Bronze
Courtney Kennedy- Bronze
Kelly Stephens- Bronze
Lyndsay Wall- Bronze
Krissy Wendell (Captain)- Bronze

2010 Winter Olympics 

Finland national team

 Noora Räty- Bronze

United States national team
Natalie Darwitz- Silver
Gigi Marvin- Silver

2014 Winter Olympics 

Finland national team

 Mira Jalosuo- 5th place
 Noora Räty- 5th place

United States national team
Megan Bozek- Silver
Amanda Kessel- Silver
Gigi Marvin- Silver
Anne Schleper- Silver
Lee Stecklein- Silver

2018 Winter Olympics 

Finland national team
Noora Räty- Bronze
Mira Jalosuo- Bronze
United States national team
Hannah Brandt- Gold
Dani Cameranesi- Gold
Amanda Kessel- Gold
Gigi Marvin- Gold
Kelly Pannek - Gold
Lee Stecklein- Gold

2022 Winter Olympics 

United States national team
Megan Bozek- Silver
Hannah Brandt- Silver
Dani Cameranesi- Silver
Amanda Kessel- Silver
Abbey Murphy- Silver
Kelly Pannek- Silver
Lee Stecklein- Silver
Grace Zumwinkle- Silver
Finland national team

 Nelli Laitinen- Bronze

Sweden national team

 Josefin Bouveng

Awards and honors

Golden Gophers in elite hockey leagues

See also
 List of college women's ice hockey coaches with 250 wins (Laura Halldorson ranks third on all-time list)

References

External links 

 
 

 
Ice hockey teams in Minnesota
Ice hockey clubs established in 1997
1997 establishments in Minnesota